= Sri Lanka Mirror =

Media outlet

- Website type: Online Newspaper
- Available in: English
- Owner: Kelum Shivantha
- Editor: Kelum Shivantha
- Website: http://srilankamirror.com
- Current status: Active

Sri Lanka Mirror is a Sri Lankan news website. It is known for its independent reporting and critical reporting and has been targeted for this. It has been banned by the Sri Lankan Government. Eight of its journalists were arrested for allegedly maligning for maligning top government officials including the then President Mahinda Rajapakse. Editor Kalum Shivantha told Reuters that “Our stories were credible and reported with responsibility. But the government may not have liked the stories we published,” Committee to Protect Journalists Bob Dietz, CPJ's Asia program coordinator said "Friday's raid shows that President Mahinda Rajapaksa's government remains determined to silence opposition voices,"
